The Trinity Suburb (Trinity Hill, or Trajeckaje pradmiescie) is a historical district of Minsk located in the north-eastern part of the historical centre on the left bank of the Svislach river. It was the trade and administrative centre of the capital of Belarus in the past. In the northwest of the Trinity Suburb there is Tatarskaya Slabada, settled by Lipka Tatars from the 15th century (first settlement recorded in 1428) to mid-20th century, and Starastinskaya Slaboda, in the north - Storozhevka, in the east - Zolotaya Gorka, in the south - the central regions of the High and Low Markets.

The first Catholic church in Minsk was located on the territory of the suburb. There were also the Ascension Monastery with the church of the same name, which have not survived to this day, St. Boris and Gleb Church, the Basilian Convent of the Holy Trinity (partially preserved) and the Church and Monastery of the Catholic monastic order. Nowadays the suburb is one of the most favorite places of Minsk residents and guests of the capital. 

Modern buildings of the district include the National Opera and Ballet Theatre, the Island of Tears, memorial that commemorates the Soviet soldiers died in the Afghanistan war in the 1970s.

There are several hypotheses about the origin of the toponym "Trinity Hill". Most likely, the placename comes from the Catholic church of the Trinity, founded by Jogaila in 1390. According to another version, the toponym comes from the name of the defensive redoubt of the Holy Trinity, which was located near the Borisov outpost.

References

External links 
 Official website of the Republic of Belarus
Minsk in your pocket. Essential city guides.
Modern photos of Trinity Hill // Website "BELTA.BY" 
Trinity Suburb in Minsk // Website "YesBelarus.com"
History of the Trinity Hill // Official website of the Belarusian TV - CTV.BY

Geography of Minsk